The African Guardian was a Nigerian newspaper that began its publication in 1985. It went defunct in 1995 during the military junta of Sani Abacha.

References 

1986 establishments in Nigeria